HP-Hrvatska pošta d.d., founded in 1999, is a joint stock company owned by the Republic of Croatia that performs postal and payment transactions. It is the national postal operator of the Republic of Croatia.   

1,016 Croatian Post offices represent one of the largest service and retail networks in the country. In addition to postal and logistics services, it also offers financial and retail services throughout Croatia. It is one of the co-founders and a full member of the Association of European Public Postal Operators (PostEurop), and the Republic of Croatia is a member of the Universal Postal Union (UPU).

The Croatian Post also issues postage stamps of the Republic of Croatia.

The period since the independence of Croatia 
In 1990, the Croatian Parliament established the public company Hrvatska pošta i telekomunikacije (HPT), with the main activity of providing postal and telecommunications services. The company was the legal successor of the former 13 companies of PTT-promet in Croatia and took over their rights and obligations. It consisted of the Joint Services (Office of the Director, Economic Affairs Division, Legal, Human Resources and General Affairs Division, Internal Control and Audit Service) and the Post and Telecommunications Directorates, which were specially organized for organizational and technological separation of postal and telecommunications systems. In 1990, HPT had 1,094 post offices, with 2,153 counters, 5,730 mailboxes and 3,744 delivery areas. [6]

Given the diversity of activities and the then technologically separate functioning of the Post Office and the Telecommunications Directorate, and in line with global trends, in 1999 HPT split into HP - Hrvatska pošta (Croatian Post) and HT - Hrvatske telekomunikacije (Croatian Telecommunications; Hrvatski Telekom as of 2010), and since then Croatian Post operates as an independent joint stock company, continuing the tradition and development continuity of postal activity in the territory of the Republic of Croatia. [6]

On 1 July 2019, the Croatian Post became a member of the International Post Corporation (IPC), an international organization that brings together leading postal operators in Europe, North America and Australia. To become a member of the IPC, one needs to meet strict criteria – from a set high percentage of delivery and quality to good financial results.

In October 2019, the Croatian Post took over the company Locodels, which specializes in same-day city delivery.

At the beginning of 2020, the Croatian Post successfully tested the possibilities of drone delivery from the Zadar port of Gaženica to Preko on the island of Ugljan. It is part of a pilot project with the Croatian company AIR-RMLD, which develops commercial and industrial services by using drones. The new tests will demonstrate the possibilities of using drones in the delivery of letters and parcels between post offices and indicate the needs of the Croatian Post for this type of technology.

New infrastructure 
In May 2017, with the laying of the foundation stone, the construction of the New Sorting Center in Velika Gorica began, a project worth HRK 350 million. The new sorting center was officially opened in September 2019 and is the largest investment in the history of the Croatian Post. The total area of the facility is 32,000 square meters, while the horticultural landscaped areas cover 16,000 square meters.

The complex employs more than 1,500 workers (sorting, postal and parcel logistics, transport and rolling stock, IT and data center, business support). The high rack warehouse has a capacity of 8,000 pallet spaces and a total carrying capacity of 6,400 tons. The capacity of the automatic package processing machine is 15,000 shipments per hour, package weight from 100 grams to 30 kilograms. Six automatic mail sorting machines help sort regular-sized letter-post items. At a speed of 230,000 items per hour and with exceptional accuracy, automatic mail sorting machines ensure timely delivery to customer addresses. Five machines are located in the New Sorting Center, while one mail sorting machine is installed in Split. The letter machine sorts by delivery area at a rate of 45,000 envelopes per hour.
 
In July 2021, the construction of an office building began, thus beginning the 2nd phase of the construction of the New Sorting Center, which will complete the complex. The total gross area of the new office building is 6,223 square meters, and the net area is 5,600 square meters. The facility will have a ground floor and four floors with office space, meeting rooms and auxiliary and technical rooms.  
 
In March 2022, a new business facility of the Croatian Post worth HRK 60 million was ceremoniously opened in the Bakar-Kukuljanovo industrial zone. Covering the area of 4,200 square meters, there are spaces for sorting, transportation, and delivery of packages, distribution center and workshops, with more than 300 employees of the Croatian Post working at the new location. With the opening of the Kukuljanovo Business Facility, the largest investment cycle in the history of Croatian Post worth one billion HRK was completed, and Istria County and Primorje-Gorski Kotar County now have one of the four most modern points in the network of sorting facilities in Croatia, which also includes facilities in Zadar and Osijek, and the New Sorting Center in Velika Gorica.

Parcel lockers 
In April 2021, the Croatian Post began to install parcel lockers and thus opened a new delivery channel. Parcel lockers are automated devices with compartments of various dimensions in which users can collect and send a shipment without contact and return goods purchased in e-shops. Parcel lockers are installed in frequent and easily accessible locations, and are available every day of the week 24/7. The delivery and sending of items from parcel lockers is handled by Paket24, a fast parcel delivery service of the Croatian Post.

By the end of 2021, 150 out of a total of 300 parcel machines planned by the end of 2022 will be installed.

Crypto stamps 
In September 2020, the Croatian Post issued the first Croatian crypto stamp. The crypto stamp consists of a physical and a digital part. The physical part of the crypto stamp can be detached and used to pay postage, while the digital part in the form of NFT (cryptographically protected digital assets) remains for use on the blockchain.

The first Croatian cryptocurrency was issued in five categories with five different motifs depicting means of transport: van (60,000 copies), train (25,000 copies), ship (10,000 copies), airplane (4,000 copies) and drone (1,000 copies). The crypto stamp was designed in cooperation with the Croatian blockchain community, and the Postereum digital token was made by the Croatian company Bitx. The package with the physical crypto stamp also includes all the data needed to activate or transfer the digital crypto stamp. All 500 crypto stamps, available for purchase with cryptocurrencies, were sold in 16 hours.

The second edition of the crypto stamp, Crypto Stamp 2, was released in December 2020 and was issued in a sheet with one self-adhesive stamp and printed in the quantity of 30,000 copies. The stamp has five digital motifs featuring the subject of postal items transport throughout history: an Austro-Hungarian postman, a postillon on a horse, a mail carriage, a telegraph delivery man on a bicycle, and a postman on a moped.

The third crypto stamp was presented on 9 September 2021 with the motif of a fully electric hypercar Rimac Nevera. The Rimac Nevera motif appears in five different categories: the golden Rimac Nevera is issued in 2,000 copies, silver in 4,000, bronze in 6,000, grey in 8,000, and blue-green in 10,000 copies, making for a total of 30,000 copies. The first 1,500 issued crypto stamps, which were available for purchase with cryptocurrencies, sold out in just over three days.

Green business and electric vehicles 
 
The Croatian Post currently has more than 200 electric vehicles in its fleet, including bicycles, quadricycles and mopeds. In the second half of 2020, charging stations for electric vehicles were set up in Velika Gorica, Osijek and Zadar, which are a basic precondition for the introduction of a larger fleet of electric vehicles. 

In April, the Croatian Post opened a new, green delivery channel for parcel lockers. Parcel lockers increase the percentage of delivery in the first attempt, and delivery vehicles have to visit fewer locations, reducing road congestion and emissions. Parcel machines are located in places that can be reached on foot or by public transport in most cases, and dozens of items can be delivered or sent in one parcel locker.

Structure
The Croatian Post is the only state-owned company that does not follow the country's administrative structure with its organizational structure. The Croatian Post segmented its internal organization by focusing on individual products and services and at the same time integrating the company's business segments into a complete corporation. In order to achieve this, a very efficient divisional structure was introduced in accordance with the most modern world standards followed by several other post services in the world. The divisional organization of the Croatian Post represents one of the largest reorganizations of companies in the Republic of Croatia.

The company is divided into four divisions: Post Division, Network Division, Express Division and Support Division.

The Post Division is in charge of transporting, sorting and delivering letter-post items. The Network Division manages the network of post offices. The Express Division is in charge of the express delivery service – Paket24. The Support Division is, among other things, in charge of finance and real property. In addition to the divisions, the Croatian Post has nine offices of the Management Board. This structure has improved business communication, so the organizational structure today is customer-oriented, and there are clear powers and responsibilities.

Services

Postal Services 
The Croatian Post is the national postal operator, and the postal services it offers include the acceptance, sorting, transport and delivery of postal items in domestic and international traffic. Universal postal services are provided on the entire territory of the Republic of Croatia and to all users under the same conditions. In addition to universal services, the Croatian Post also provides a number of other postal services: acceptance, sorting, transport and delivery of direct mail, stationery (books and printing), parcels, paid reply items (IBRS/CCRI items), express mail items (EMS) and value-added shipments: Paket24, business parcel and e-parcel.

ePost 
ePost is a service by which Croatian Post enables its users to perform a number of services electronically. The ePost service allows you to receive and send letters, messages and documents (including invoices) in electronic form, pay bills by credit and debit cards, whether they arrived via the service or at your home address, and save documents in a secure archive accessible anywhere and anytime. After logging into the ePost service, which uses current certificate-based security standards, users can securely and easily manage their documents. The ePost service offers legal entities an easier and more convenient communication with their users. The ePost is a service of the Croatian Post that allows users to create, receive and view and store mail more comfortably and easily. All documents (invoices, statements, notices, etc.) are in one place and the user can access them from any computer. You can use ePost to: send a business e-Invoice, send an e-Invoice to citizens, receive invoices, receive documents, letters and messages, and send letters and messages

Bank at the Post
Bank at the Post is a joint project of Hrvatska poštanska banka and the Croatian Post. As part of the project, banking services of Hrvatska poštanska banka are provided to private and business users in post offices throughout Croatia. Since December 2020, business customers (private companies, small and medium-sized enterprises, local government and self-government) can open an HPB business account in almost 1,000 post offices, perform national payment transactions in HRK, contract Internet and mobile banking, deposit, cards and other banking services.

Yellow click 
Yellow Click is an online store of the Croatian Post with a products divided into 14 categories. Yellow Click has one of the most diverse offers of local food products from local family farms from all over Croatia, which is offered in the category “Click for local – products of the Croatian village.”

Paket24 
The Paket24 service is an express delivery service of the Croatian Post that evenly covers the entire territory of the Republic of Croatia and guarantees next-day delivery of items in more than 200 locations.

Locodels 
Locodels is a company owned by the Croatian Post that provides same-day city delivery services. Locodels provides a same-day delivery service in cooperation with online stores in all major Croatian cities.

eRegistered 
eRegistered is a qualified electronic delivery service of registered items and is available as part of the ePost service. By activating the new service, all natural and legal persons can receive and send registered items digitally. eRegistered has the same legal effect as the delivery of the registered item to the physical address.

Financial services 
In post offices, the Croatian Post offers various financial services such as cash transfers, bill payments, cash withdrawals, and exchange offices. Savings and insurance policies can also be arranged.

Cryptocurrency exchange 
In December 2019, the cryptocurrency redemption service was introduced in 55 post offices in all counties where foreign and domestic users can convert cryptocurrencies into kuna. In October 2021, the service was extended to sell cryptocurrencies.

The most commonly used cryptocurrencies can be found in post offices, and the list of currently available ones, the exchange rate and the list of post offices where the service is available can be checked on the website https://kripto.posta.hr/.

Retail 
A variety of retail products such as greeting cards and postcards, books, technical goods, and toys are available in post offices, and there is also the possibility of ordering goods by catalog.

Philately 
The Croatian Post has been issuing postage stamps of the Republic of Croatia since 1991. The first regular postage stamp, Zagreb-Dubrovnik Airport, was issued on 9 September 1991, and the first commemorative postage stamp was issued on 10 December 1991 on the occasion of the declaration of independence of the Republic of Croatia. Since then, in 30 years, the Croatian Post has issued 1,360 postage stamps (September 2021) with a wide range of topics and motifs. Postage stamps issued by the Croatian Post have also won numerous international awards. [7]

"Vaša pošta" Foundation 
The Croatian Post has established the “Vaša pošta” Foundation in order to provide financial assistance to children without adequate parental care to make it easier for them to become independent. Sponsors found by the Croatian Post waive their commissions in order to pay life insurance policies on behalf of the children. This amount is paid to the residents of foster homes as a kind of annuity at the time of leaving the foster home, so that they can cover the basic costs of living until they find employment. The establishment of the Foundation is a continuation of the humanitarian project “Good People to the Children of Croatia”, which the Croatian Post has been implementing since 2009.

See also
 List of postal codes in Croatia
 General Post Office, Zagreb

Sources

 
 Corporate pages of Croatian post

External links
 
 Hakom - Croatian Post and Electronic Communications Agency - Annual business report for  2012 

Communications in Croatia
Croatia
Organizations established in 1990
Government-owned companies of Croatia
Croatian companies established in 1990